The New Era (German: Neue Ära) was the term for the government policy in the Kingdom of Prussia between Autumn 1858 and Spring 1862. It followed the Era of Reaction under Frederick William IV.

Overview 
The New Era began with the regency of Wilhelm on October 7, 1858, who became King Wilhelm I in 1861. After the Era of Reaction of the 1850s, which had emphasized the preservation of the old conservative prerogatives, the new Regent tried to enforce reforms by calling together a conservative-liberal coalition government. However, the reforms were blocked by the deputies from the Junker nobility, which led the Prussian House of Lords.

References

Political history of Germany
Politics of Prussia